Animals is a 2021 psychological thriller film directed by Nabil Ben Yadir. It stars Soufiane Chilah and was written by Antoine Cuypers and Ben Yadir, who also produced alongside Benoit Roland. The film is based on the 2012 murder of gay man Ihsane Jarfi in Liège. The murder was denounced as a hate crime and became the first case of homophobic violence recognized by law in Belgium.

It was screened at the Film Fest Ghent on 13 October 2021, where it competed for the Grand Prix. At the 12th Magritte Awards, Animals received six nominations, including Best Film and Best Director for Ben Yadir.

Cast
 Soufiane Chilah as Ihsane Jarfi
 Gianni Guettaf as Loïc
 Vincent Overath as Geoffroy
 Lionel Maisin as Christophe
 Serkan Sancak as Milos

Critical reception
Animals received polarized reviews from film critics, with praise towards Soufiane Chilah's performance and Frank van den Eeden's cinematography, but criticism towards its graphic portrayal of violence and crime.

Accolades

References

External links
 

2021 films
2021 crime drama films
2021 crime thriller films
2021 LGBT-related films
Belgian crime drama films
Belgian crime thriller films
Belgian films based on actual events
Crime films based on actual events
Drama films based on actual events
Films set in the 2010s
Films set in Belgium
Gay-related films
Homophobia in fiction
LGBT-related drama films
LGBT-related films based on actual events
Films about violence against LGBT people
2000s French-language films
Belgian LGBT-related films